As of February 2001, there were 1,124 listed buildings with Grade II status in the English city of Brighton and Hove. The total at 2009 was similar. Queen Elizabeth II granted city status in 2000.

In England, a building or structure is defined as "listed" when it is placed on a statutory register of buildings of "special architectural or historic interest" by the Secretary of State for Culture, Media and Sport, a Government department, in accordance with the Planning (Listed Buildings and Conservation Areas) Act 1990.  English Heritage, a non-departmental public body, acts as an agency of this department to administer the process and advise the department on relevant issues.  There are three grades of listing status.  The Grade II designation is the lowest, and is used for "nationally important buildings of special interest".  Grade II* is used for "particularly important buildings of more than special interest"; there are 69 such buildings in the city.  There are also 24 Grade I listed buildings (defined as being of "exceptional interest" and greater than national importance, and the highest of the three grades) in Brighton and Hove.

This list summarises 96 Grade II-listed buildings and structures whose names begin with T, U or V.  Numbered buildings with no individual name are listed by the name of the street they stand on.  Some listings include contributory fixtures such as surrounding walls or railings in front of the building.  These are summarised by notes alongside the building name.

Listed buildings

See also
Buildings and architecture of Brighton and Hove
Grade I listed buildings in Brighton and Hove
Grade II* listed buildings in Brighton and Hove
List of conservation areas in Brighton and Hove

References

Notes

Bibliography

 
Lists of Grade II listed buildings in East Sussex